Maurice Pouzieux (31 August 1920 – 5 February 1980) was a French long-distance runner. He competed in the men's 5000 metres at the 1948 Summer Olympics.

References

1920 births
1980 deaths
Athletes (track and field) at the 1948 Summer Olympics
French male long-distance runners
Olympic athletes of France
Place of birth missing